Tetragonisca is a genus of stingless bees in the family Apidae. There are at least four described species in Tetragonisca, found in Central and South America.

Species
These four species belong to the genus Tetragonisca:
 Tetragonisca angustula (Latreille, 1825)
 Tetragonisca buchwaldi
 Tetragonisca fiebrigi (Schwarz, 1938)
 Tetragonisca weyrauchi (Schwarz, 1943)

References

Further reading

 

Meliponini